The 1983 Extremaduran regional election was held on Sunday, 8 May 1983, to elect the 1st Assembly of the autonomous community of Extremadura. All 65 seats in the Assembly were up for election. The election was held simultaneously with regional elections in twelve other autonomous communities and local elections all throughout Spain.

The Spanish Socialist Workers' Party (PSOE), under the leadership of pre-autonomic president Juan Carlos Rodríguez Ibarra, won a landslide victory by securing 53% of the share and 36 out of 65 seats. The People's Coalition, the electoral alliance of the People's Alliance (AP), the People's Democratic Party (PDP) and the Liberal Union (UL), emerged as the second largest political force with 30% of the vote and 20 seats, whereas United Extremadura (EU) and the Communist Party of Spain (PCE) entered the Assembly with 6 and 4 seats, respectively.

Overview

Electoral system
The Assembly of Extremadura was the devolved, unicameral legislature of the autonomous community of Extremadura, having legislative power in regional matters as defined by the Spanish Constitution and the Extremaduran Statute of Autonomy, as well as the ability to vote confidence in or withdraw it from a regional president.

Transitory Provision First of the Statute established a specific electoral procedure for the first election to the Regional Assembly of Murcia, to be supplemented by the provisions within Royal Decree-Law 20/1977, of 18 March, and its related regulations. Voting for the Assembly was on the basis of universal suffrage, which comprised all nationals over 18 years of age, registered in Extremadura and in full enjoyment of their political rights. The 65 members of the Assembly of Extremadura were elected using the D'Hondt method and a closed list proportional representation, with an electoral threshold of five percent of valid votes—which included blank ballots—being applied in each constituency. Alternatively, parties failing to reach the threshold in one of the constituencies were also entitled to enter the seat distribution as long as they ran candidates in both districts and reached five percent regionally. Seats were allocated to constituencies, corresponding to the provinces of Badajoz and Cáceres, with each being allocated a fixed number of seats: 35 for Badajoz and 30 for Cáceres.

Election date
The Junta of Extremadura, in agreement with the Government of Spain, was required to call an election to the Assembly of Extremadura before 31 May 1983. In the event of an investiture process failing to elect a regional president within a two-month period from the first ballot, the Assembly was to be automatically dissolved and a snap election called, with elected deputies merely serving out what remained of their four-year terms.

On 7 March 1983, it was confirmed that the first election to the Assembly of Extremadura would be held on Sunday, 8 May, together with regional elections for twelve other autonomous communities as well as nationwide local elections.

Parliamentary composition
The first election to the Assembly of Extremadura was officially called on 10 March 1983, after the publication of the election decree in the Official Gazette of the Autonomous Community of Extremadura, with the mandate of the provisional Assembly ending on 8 May 1983. The table below shows the composition of the parliamentary groups in the provisional Assembly at the time of its expiry.

Parties and candidates
The electoral law allowed for parties and federations registered in the interior ministry, coalitions and groupings of electors to present lists of candidates. Parties and federations intending to form a coalition ahead of an election were required to inform the relevant Electoral Commission within fifteen days of the election call, whereas groupings of electors needed to secure the signature of at least one-thousandth of the electorate in the constituencies for which they sought election—with a compulsory minimum of 500 signatures—disallowing electors from signing for more than one list of candidates.

Below is a list of the main parties and electoral alliances which contested the election:

Results

Overall

Distribution by constituency

Aftermath

Government formation

1987 motion of no confidence

Notes

References

1983 in Extremadura
Extremadura
Regional elections in Extremadura
May 1983 events in Europe